Al-Kassed Islamic Charitable Society Hospital is a Islamic teaching hospital and charitable hospital of the Palestinian Arab’s charitable founded by Makassed Islamic Charitable Society,  There is one of district general hospital from part of six hospitals in the East Jerusalem Hospitals Network. It has 250 beds and is situated on Mount of Olives in East Jerusalem. It serves as a tertiary referral hospital mainly for the Arab population of the Palestinian territories, namely the West Bank (including East Jerusalem) and the Gaza Strip, but also provides health care for the Israeli population when they meet obstacles using other facilities. It is a teaching hospital of Al-Quds University Faculty of Medicine.

The hospital is part of the East Jerusalem Hospitals Network together with the Augusta Victoria Hospital, the Red Crescent Maternity Hospital (also called Palestinian Red Crescent Society Hospital), the Saint John Eye Hospital, the Princess Basma Rehabilitation Center, and St. Joseph's Hospital. The network plays a crucial role in the Palestinian health care system.

Most of the staff and patients come the other side of the Israeli West Bank barrier which constantly causes difficulties for both groups reach the hospital. The hospital provides accommodation for patients and their relatives from the Gaza strip for whom getting to the hospital is especially difficult.

Al-Makassed Hospital was founded in 1968, There had 60 beds.

References

External links 

  

Hospitals in Jerusalem
Hospitals in the State of Palestine
Hospitals established in 1968
Medical education in the State of Palestine
Teaching hospitals
East Jerusalem Hospitals Network